Itse (Finnish "self") is the debut studio album by the Finnish dark metal band Ajattara. It was released in 2001 on Spikefarm Records.

Track listing

Personnel
 Ruoja - vocals, guitars, keyboards
 Atoni - bass
 Malakias I - drums

Additional personnel and staff
 Niklas Sundin - cover art
 Mika Jussila - mastering
 Tuomo Valtonen - producer

External links
 Itse at Allmusic

2001 debut albums
Ajattara albums